The Fullerton Post Office, better known as the Commonwealth Station, was built in 1939 by the Works Progress Administration, in Fullerton, Orange County, Southern California. Construction costs were $56,000 and took less than seven months to complete. The building was dedicated on November 1, 1938. It is a one-story, rectangular structure at the south east corner of the intersection of S. Pomona Ave. and E. Commonwealth Ave. Built on a raised platform, the post office has six steps at the public entrance. In the back, there is a loading dock for mail trucks. The building has been a post office since it first opened and has been serving the residents and businesses in the downtown area of Fullerton. Its proximity to the Fullerton Transportation Center makes it readily accessible.

References

Post office buildings in California
Buildings and structures in Fullerton, California
Tourist attractions in Fullerton, California